Ignacio David Fideleff (born 4 July 1989) is an Argentine-Israeli footballer who plays as a centre back. He plays for St. Lucia in Malta.

Early life
Fideleff was born in Rosario, Argentina, to parents of Russian-Jewish descent. He was granted Israeli citizenship in 2013.

Career
Fideleff was born in Rosario, Santa Fe and grown up as a footballer in Club Atlético Newell's Old Boys' youths. He made his debut for the Newell's first team on 24 March 2008 against Lanús, scoring a goal. He played for the club for five seasons, collecting 35 appearances in Argentine Primera División, scoring 3 goals.

At the start of the 2011–12 season, Fideleff was purchased by Serie A club Napoli, for a reported fee of around €3m, believed to be a substitute for Spaniard Víctor Ruiz who was sold to Valencia. He debuted in Serie A on 21 September 2011, featuring in the starting line-up against Veronese club Chievo.

On 14 July 2012, Fideleff joined Parma on a loan deal for the 2012-13 season.

On 30 January 2013, Fideleff joined Maccabi Tel Aviv on a loan deal for the remainder of the season. The deal came through after Fideleff received an Israeli citizenship due to his Jewish origins.

On 5 August 2013, Fideleff returned to Argentina to join Tigre on a season-long loan.

In January 2018, Fideleff signed with ÍBV of the Icelandic Úrvalsdeild karla on trial. In April it was reported that he had been released by ÍBV due to injury.

Fideleff moved to Malta in the summer 2019 and signed with Maltese club St. Lucia on 5 July 2019.

Honours
Napoli
Coppa Italia: 2011–12

Maccabi Tel Aviv
Israeli Premier League: 2012–13

References

External links
Profile at bdfa.com.ar

1989 births
Living people
Footballers from Rosario, Santa Fe
Association football central defenders
Argentine footballers
Argentine expatriate footballers
Argentina under-20 international footballers
Argentine Primera División players
Serie A players
Super League Greece players
Newell's Old Boys footballers
S.S.C. Napoli players
Parma Calcio 1913 players
Ergotelis F.C. players
Club Nacional footballers
Kemi City F.C. players
St. Lucia F.C. players
Expatriate footballers in Italy
Expatriate footballers in Paraguay
Expatriate footballers in Greece
Expatriate footballers in Finland
Expatriate footballers in Malta
Argentine expatriate sportspeople in Italy
Argentine expatriate sportspeople in Paraguay
Argentine expatriate sportspeople in Greece
Argentine expatriate sportspeople in Finland
Argentine expatriate sportspeople in Malta
Argentine people of Russian-Jewish descent
Israeli people of Argentine-Jewish descent
Sportspeople of Argentine descent
Israeli people of Russian-Jewish descent